Guglielmo Bastoni (1544–1609) was a Roman Catholic prelate who served as Bishop of Pavia (1593–1609) and Apostolic Nuncio to Naples (1606–1609).

Biography
Guglielmo Bastoni was born on 5 Dec 1544 in Milan, Italy.
On 30 Apr 1593, he was appointed during the papacy of Pope Clement VIII as Bishop of Pavia.
On 6 May 1593, he was consecrated bishop by Michele Bonelli, Cardinal-Bishop of Albano, with Ludovico de Torres, Archbishop of Monreale, and Owen Lewis, Bishop of Cassano all'Jonio, serving as co-consecrators. 
On 26 May 1606, he was appointed during the papacy of Pope Paul V as Apostolic Nuncio to Naples.
He served as Bishop of Pavia and Apostolic Nuncio to Naples until his death in Jan 1609.

Episcopal succession
While bishop, he was the principal co-consecrator of:

References

External links and additional sources
 (for Chronology of Bishops) 
 (for Chronology of Bishops) 
 (for Chronology of Bishops) 

17th-century Italian Roman Catholic bishops
Bishops appointed by Pope Clement VIII
Bishops appointed by Pope Paul V
1544 births
1609 deaths
Apostolic Nuncios to the Kingdom of Naples
16th-century Italian Roman Catholic bishops